Édouard Gustav Bunge (16 October 1851 – 19 November 1927) was a Belgian businessman, banker, and philanthropist.

Early life
Bunge was born on 16 October 1851, in Antwerp in the Flemish Region of Belgium. He was a son of Charles Gustave Bunge (1811–1884) and Laura (née Fallenstein) Bunge (1820–1899).

His brother, Ernest Bunge, was the father of Ivan Bunge of Le Havre, and the grandfather of Gerard Michel Bunge. His maternal grandparents were Georg Friedrich Fallenstein (a close friend of Georg Gottfried Gervinus) and Elisabeth (née Benecke) Fallenstein. Through his aunt, Helene Fallenstein (who was married to Max Weber Sr.), he was a first cousin of the prominent German sociologist and historian Max Weber and economist Alfred Weber.

Career
Bunge began working for the family business, today known as Bunge Limited, which had been founded by his grandfather, Johann Peter Gottlieb Bunge, in Amsterdam in 1818 as an import-export business.

In 1859, Édouard relocated the family company to Antwerp. Edouard's brother Ernest brought the company into Argentina in 1884 and, in 1905, the business extended to Brazil and later on to the United States.

Personal life
In 1886 Bunge was married to Marie-Sophie Karcher (1863–1907). Together, they were the parents of:

 Sophia-Laura Bunge (1887–1959), who married Felix Rhodius.
 Dorothée Emilie Bunge (1889–1918), who married Victor Théodore Bracht.
 Erica Bunge (1891–1986), who married Milton McIntyre Brown.
 Eva Maria Bunge (b. 1894), who married Andrew James Widderson, OBE.
 Hilda Bunge (1895–1980), who married American industrialist William Hallam Tuck in Antwerp in 1920. He was a son of Judge Somerville Pinkney Tuck, and brother to Ambassador Somerville Pinkney Tuck and businessman Alexander J. M. Tuck.

Before his death, "he donated a large sum for the establishment of an institute of medicine and surgery for the study of the most modern methods of science." Bunge died on 18 November 1927, in Ekeren, Belgium.

Descendants
Through his daughter Dorothée, he was a grandfather of Charles Victor Bracht, who was created a baron in 1967 for his services to industry and was later kidnapped and murdered.

References

1851 births
1927 deaths
Businesspeople from Antwerp
Belgian businesspeople
Belgian business executives